Óscar Andrés Morales Guifarro (born 12 May 1986) is a Honduran football player, who currently plays for Juticalpa in the Honduran Second Division.

Club career
Morales started his career at Atletico Olanchano and joined Real España in October 2007. He then signed for Platense at the end of 2010 but left them already after the 2011 Clausura season.

He joined Vida for the 2012 Clausura championship and moved to Juticalpa in January 2013.

International career
He was also part of the U-23 Honduras national football team that won the 2008 CONCACAF Men's Pre-Olympic Tournament and qualified to the 2008 Summer Olympics, where he played in two games.

References

1986 births
Living people
People from Olancho Department
Association football defenders
Honduran footballers
Footballers at the 2008 Summer Olympics
Olympic footballers of Honduras
Atlético Olanchano players
Real C.D. España players
Platense F.C. players
C.D.S. Vida players
Liga Nacional de Fútbol Profesional de Honduras players